Golden Hearts Remembrance is an album by American jazz trumpeter Wadada Leo Smith which was recorded in 1997 and released on the Japanese Chap Chap label. He leads the ensemble N'Da Kulture, a sextet that blends jazz with Eastern music and the poetry of Smith's wife, Harumi Makino Smith.

Reception

In his review for AllMusic, Thom Jurek states "All of the works here segue into others, shimmering along with spatial reflections and subtle tonal interaction that relies on the execution of sound as sound rather than as a series of notes to be correctly played in a composition."

Track listing
All compositions by Wadada Leo Smith
 "Emmeya" - 12:08
 "Lotus Garden" - 12:15
 "Tawhid" - 9:50
 "Golden Hearts Remembrance, A Nur Bakhshad" - 12:48
 "Condor" - 14:42
 "Mother: Sarah Brown-Smith-Wallace" - 7:28

Personnel
Wadada Leo Smith - trumpet, flugelhorn, nohkan
David Philipson - bansuri, tambura
William Roper - tuba
Glenn Horiuchi - piano, shamisen
Sonship Theus - drums, percussion
Harumi Makino Smith - poetry

References

1997 albums
Wadada Leo Smith albums